Coles County Memorial Airport  is between Mattoon and Charleston in Coles County, Illinois. Owned by the Coles County Airport Authority, it is five miles east of Mattoon and six miles west of Charleston. The National Plan of Integrated Airport Systems for 2011–2015 called it a general aviation facility.

Airline flights (Ozark DC-3s) started in 1955; Ozark left in 1980. American Eagle flew to Chicago's O'Hare until 1991. Midway Connections also flew to Midway International in Chicago. Airline service ended in 2000 when Great Lakes Airlines, which operated flights to Chicago's O'Hare International Airport through the Purdue University Airport, left the airport. The service was under the United Express name.

The airport hosts an air show featuring aerial performances and static display as well as helicopter and monster truck rides. The show is free but accepts donations from visitors.

Facilities
The airport covers 1,225 acres (496 ha) at an elevation of 722 feet (220 m). It has three runways:
 11/29 is 6,501 by 150 feet (1,982 x 46 m) concrete/grooved; has ILS
 6/24 is 5,799 by 100 feet (1,768 x 30 m) asphalt
 18/36 is 1,080 by 250 feet (329 x 76 m) turf

Other facilities:
 VOR/DME (MTO): 109.40 MHz  automated weather available on VOR 
 Fixed-base operator: Coles County Aviation
 Airport Steakhouse Restaurant

For the 12-month period ending December 31, 2020, the airport had 27,000 aircraft operations, an average of 74 per day. This included 89% general aviation, 9% air taxi, and 2% military. For the same time period, the airport had 51 based aircraft, including 38 single-engine airplanes, 10 helicopters, 2 multi-engine airplanes, and 1 jet.

Accidents & Incidents
On June 18, 2003, a Ercoupe 415-C that took off from Coles County experienced an off-airport landing while en route to Cooch Landing Area Airport in Atwood, Illinois. The probable cause was found to be the pilot's selection of an unsuitable landing area and his improper decision to continue the approach without the airport and runway clearly in sight.

References

External links 
 Coles County Airport
 Central Illinois Air, the fixed-base operator
 Aerial image as of March 1999 from USGS The National Map
 

Airports in Illinois
Transportation buildings and structures in Coles County, Illinois
Former Essential Air Service airports